Atractus discovery is a species of snake in the family Colubridae. The species can be found in Ecuador.

References 

Atractus
Reptiles of Ecuador
Endemic fauna of Ecuador
Snakes of South America
Reptiles described in 2022